Frank Joseph Rodimer (October 25, 1927 – December 6, 2018) was an American prelate of the Catholic Church. He served as the sixth bishop of the Diocese of Paterson in New Jersey from 1977 to 2004.

Biography

Early life 
Frank Rodimer was born on October 25, 1927, in Rockaway, New Jersey. He graduated from Seton Hall Preparatory School, then attended St. Charles College in Catonsville, Maryland and St. Mary's Seminary, Baltimore, Maryland.

Priesthood 
Rodimer was ordained to the priesthood for the Diocese of Paterson on May 19, 1951.  He studied at the Catholic University of America in Washington, D.C., obtaining his licentiate in theology in 1951.  He also received a doctorate in canon law in 1954 for a thesis entitled The Canonical Effects of Infamy of Fact: A Historical Synopsis and Commentary, published by the Catholic University of America Press.

In June 1954, Rodimer returned to New Jersey and was appointed assistant chancellor of the diocese and secretary of the diocesan Tribunal. During this time, he served as assistant pastor to St. Brendan's Parish in Clifton, New Jersey.

Rodimer was appointed first diocesan director of sacred liturgy. He was named priest-secretary of Bishop James J. Navagh and attended the sessions of the Second Vatican Council as Navagh's principal aide. In December 1964, he was appointed secretary of the diocesan College of Consultors. As priest-secretary, Rodimer was in Rome when Bishop Navagh died there in October 1965, and was responsible for returning to New Jersey with the body of the bishop for burial services. 

Under his predecessor Bishop Lawrence B. Casey, Rodimer served as administrator of Our Lady of the Lake Parish in Sparta, New Jersey, from April 1967 to January 1968, at which time he became pastor of St. Paul's Parish in Clifton. He also served as the diocesan chancellor, and in that capacity, was elected diocesan administrator by the College of Consultors upon Casey's death in June 1977.

Bishop of Paterson 
On December 5, 1977, Pope Paul VI appointed Rodimer the sixth bishop of the Diocese Paterson, the first native-born bishop in the diocese. He was consecrated bishop on February 28, 1978, with Archbishop Peter Gerety as principal consecrator, and Archbishops Joseph Bernardin  and Peter Poreku Dery serving as co-consecrators.

As bishop, Rodimer wrote a weekly column for the diocesan newspaper, The Beacon. He also established a $7 million diocesan endowment to support Catholic schools, parishes and other diocesan ministries through fund raising. With corporate leaders, Rodimer established the Tri-County Scholarship fund to provide scholarships to needy students attending Catholic schools. During his tenure, Rodimer made public his opposition to capital punishment and to permanent replacements for striking workers.

Although he once declared, "I fear for a society which deplores but does little or nothing to address the horrible daily realities which many of our children face", Rodimer admitted his "own inadequacy" in failing to prevent at least four of his clerical colleagues, with whom he shared a Long Island beach house, from committing sexual abuse.

Retirement and legacy 
Rodimer retired as Bishop on June 1, 2004, after twenty-six years of service.  A 2020 report revealed that a Diocese of Paterson priest had informed Rodimer in the late 1980s of allegations that former Cardinal Theodore McCarrick had sexually abused boys at his beach house and that Rodimer had responded that he would contact U.S. representatives of the Vatican.

Frank Rodimer died on December 6, 2018 at his residence in St. Joseph’s Home for the Elderly in Totowa, New Jersey, aged 91.

See also
 
 Catholic Church hierarchy
 Catholic Church in the United States
 Historical list of the Catholic bishops of the United States
 List of Catholic bishops of the United States
 Lists of patriarchs, archbishops, and bishops

References

External links
Roman Catholic Diocese of Paterson Official Site
USCCB - Press Release

Episcopal succession

1927 births
2018 deaths
People from Rockaway, New Jersey
Catholic University of America alumni
20th-century Roman Catholic bishops in the United States
Roman Catholic bishops of Paterson
21st-century Roman Catholic bishops in the United States
Seton Hall Preparatory School alumni